Chocolate and Cheese is the fourth studio album by the American rock band Ween, originally released by Elektra Records in 1994. It was the first Ween album to be recorded in a professional studio, in contrast to the crude four-track home recordings of The Pod and Pure Guava. However, most of the instruments were still played by Dean and Gene Ween, including their drum machine.

Reception and legacy

In July 2014, Guitar World placed Chocolate and Cheese at #45 in their "Superunknown: 50 Iconic Albums That Defined 1994" list. The entire album was played live as part of the group's setlist at the Desert Daze festival in California on October 12, 2019.

Background
The album is dedicated to comedian John Candy, who died while Ween was putting the album together. "A Tear for Eddie" was dedicated to the funk/psychedelic guitar pioneer Eddie Hazel, who died December 23, 1992. In a 2011 interview, Gene Ween credited a Spanish lesson on Sesame Street with inspiring "Buenas Tardes Amigo". The album's title is phonetically similar to the British saying "chalk and cheese," a way of saying that two items have nothing in common.

Album cover
Ween originally wanted the cover to have a "gay sailor theme" but the studio thought this was inappropriate, opting instead for a woman's body on the cover. The band say that they never got to meet the cover model, a Penthouse Pet named Ashley Savage. The cover was shot by John Kuczala.

Related releases
"I Can't Put My Finger on It" is an EP released by Elektra Records in 1994, and including the tracks "I Can't Put My Finger on It", "A Tear for Eddie", "Now I'm Freaking Out" and "Bakersfield".

"Voodoo Lady EP" was released by Flying Nun Records (as a 7") and White Records (as a CD) in 1994, and included the tracks "Buenas Tardes Amigo", "There's a Pig" (CD version only), and "Vallejo" (CD version only).  The EP's title track can be heard in the films Road Trip and Dude, Where's My Car?, as well as the original version of "In The Bathroom," a skit from the sketch comedy show The State, while the album track "Buenas Tardes Amigo" was featured in the German films Lammbock and Herr Lehmann.

"Freedom of '76" is an EP released by Flying Nun Records in 1995, and included two versions of the title track plus "Now I'm Freaking Out" and "Pollo Asado". CKY guitarist (and dedicated Ween fan) Chad Ginsburg appeared in the "Freedom of '76" promo video as an extra shouting at Gene and Dean after they stole the Liberty Bell.

Original Vinyl Pressings:
On top of the Elektra Records release (Elektra 61639-2 US 1994), it was pressed and distributed by Grand Royal Records in the US in 1994 with a 2 LP non-gatefold version (Grand Royal GR 010 US 1994). Flying Nun Records from New Zealand released two different versions in 1994, one of which came with a bonus 7" single (Flying Nun Records FN314 Europe 1994, no 7") and (Flying Nun Records FNSP314 UK 1994, with 7").

Note that there is a catalog number for the vinyl issue by Elektra Records, but there is no confirmation it was pressed on vinyl at this time, possibly only in promo edition.

Cover versions:
 "Roses Are Free" has been covered by the band Phish 51 times between 12-11-1997 and 7-16-2022. Official releases of their version appear on Phish's live concert albums Hampton Comes Alive (1999) and Live Phish 04.03.98 (2005). The 2000 documentary Bittersweet Motel features the band learning the track backstage at the Rochester War Memorial in Rochester, NY and then transitions into their first onstage interpretation. In an interview from 2015, Melchiondo observed that Ween began playing "Roses Are Free" regularly in concert after Phish began covering it, and credited Phish for boosting the song's popularity. Phish's guitarist, Trey Anastasio, commented to the crowd after their 8-7-2015 cover, suggesting that Mickey and Aaron should play together again, which was followed by Ween's first comeback show at the 1stBank Center in Broomfield, CO on 2-12-2016 where the song was played among 32 others. 
 Ash recorded a version of "What Deaner Was Talkin' About", released as a B-side on their 1997 single "A Life Less Ordinary". This track also features on their limited edition live album, Live at the Wireless.
 Amos Lee performed "Buenas Tardes Amigo" on an iTunes exclusive live album entitled "iTunes Live From SoHo".
 Jon Auer (The Posies, Big Star) covered "Baby Bitch" on his solo EP "6 1/2."

Track listing
All tracks written by Ween, except "Freedom of '76", written by Ween and Ed Wilson.

Personnel
The band
Dean Ween – guitar, vocals, drums
Gene Ween – vocals
Claude Coleman Jr. – drums

Additional personnel
Mean Ween – bass
Greg Frey – engineer
Howie Weinberg – mastering
Andrew Weiss – producer, engineer, mixing
Kirk Miller – live sound
Ashley Savage – model
Danny Clinch – photography
John Kuczala – photography
Reiner Design Consultants – design
Patricia Frey – drums
Scott Lowe – programming
Stephan Said – Spanish guitar

Charts

References

External links
 

Ween albums
1994 albums
Elektra Records albums
Neo-psychedelia albums